The following is a list of ecoregions in Iran as identified by the World Wide Fund for Nature (WWF).

Terrestrial ecoregions
Iran is in the Palearctic realm. Ecoregions are listed by biome.

Temperate broadleaf and mixed forests
 Caspian Hyrcanian mixed forests
 Zagros Mountains forest steppe

Temperate coniferous forests
 Elburz Range forest steppe

Temperate grasslands, savannas, and shrublands
 Eastern Anatolian montane steppe
Middle East steppe

Flooded grasslands and savannas
 Tigris-Euphrates alluvial salt marsh

Montane grasslands and shrublands
 Kopet Dag woodlands and forest steppe
 Kuh Rud and Eastern Iran montane woodlands

Deserts and xeric shrublands
 Arabian desert
 Azerbaijan shrub desert and steppe
 Badghyz and Karabil semi-desert
 Baluchistan xeric woodlands
 Caspian lowland desert
 Central Persian desert basins
 Kopet Dag semi-desert
 Mesopotamian shrub desert
 Registan–North Pakistan sandy desert
 South Iran Nubo-Sindian desert and semi-desert

Freshwater ecoregions
 Baluchistan
 Caspian Highlands
 Esfahan
 Helmand-Sistan
 Kavir and Lut Deserts
 Kura-South Caspian Drainages
 Namak
 Northern Hormuz Drainages
 Orumiyeh
 Lower Tigris and Euphrates
 Upper Tigris and Euphrates
 Turan Plain
 Upper Amu Darya

References

 
Iran
Iran geography-related lists